Stefano Baraldo (born 25 January 1992) is an Italian footballer who played in the third tier of football in Italy.

Biography
Born in Codogno, Lombardy, Baraldo started his career with Emilian club Piacenza, about 14 km away from his hometown. Baraldo was the member of Italy under-17 team at 2009 UEFA European Under-17 Football Championship. He left the reserve of Piacenza on 15 August 2010, for 2010–11 Lega Pro Prima Divisione club Barletta. Baraldo played 4 time for the Apulia-based club: twice in the league as the substitutes of D'Allocco and Anselmi respectively; Baraldo was the starting fullback for the club in 2010–11 Coppa Italia Lega Pro (2 out of possible 6 matches). Baraldo also received recall from national youth team for 2011 UEFA European Under-19 Football Championship qualification, despite he was cut from the 23-men preliminary squad to the final 18-men squad. On 17 November 2010 Barletta announced that Baraldo would return to Piacenza once the January transfer window opens. On 31 January 2011 Baraldo was signed by Empoli. However he only played once for their reserve. Baraldo returned to Piacenza on 1 July 2011 which the club had relegated to 2011–12 Lega Pro Prima Divisione; Baraldo played for the club at 2011–12 Coppa Italia Lega Pro.

Footnotes

References

Italian footballers
Piacenza Calcio 1919 players
A.S.D. Barletta 1922 players
Empoli F.C. players
Italy youth international footballers
Association football fullbacks
Sportspeople from the Province of Lodi
1992 births
Living people
Footballers from Lombardy